Aristakes Lastivertsi (1002 – 1080) was a medieval Armenian historian and chronicler. The author of many works, Aristakes' most valuable contribution in the field of the historiography was his History: About the Sufferings Visited Upon by Foreign Peoples Living Around Us (Պատմություն: մեր շրջապատի այլացեղ ազգերից մեզ հասած արհավիրքների մասին), which described Armenia's relations with the Byzantine Empire and Georgia and the devastating Seljuk invasions of the 11th century and the torture of Christians by the Seljuks.

Biography
Once thought to have been born in a village with either the name Lastivard or Lastivert, scholars now believe that Aristakes was born in a village, possibly near the city of Artsn, called Lastiver. Details about his life are fragmented. As a vardapet, he was well versed in Christian theology and knew Greek and probably several other languages. He wrote his history from 1072 to 1079, without the support of a patron, recounting contemporary history of which he was an eyewitness. Composed of 25 chapters and a unique colophon, Aristakes describes the Seljuk invasions in 1047-48 through the capture of Ani in 1064 and the Battle of Manzikert (1071).

References
Lastivertli Aristakes'in Tarihi, Bizans ve Türkler Arasında Ermeniler, çev: Engin Öztürk, Istanbul: Urzeni, 2020.

External links
Full online translation of Aristakes' History by Dr. Robert Bedrosian
 English translation of the History - mirror if main site is unavailable
Aristakes Lastiveratsi at the Digital Library Of Armenian Literature
Lastivertsi at Matenadaran

11th-century Armenian historians
1002 births
1080 deaths